The Bottom Line is Bryant University's premier co-ed a cappella group. Founded in 2006, this award winning, student run organization performs at various events both on and off Bryant's campus during the course of the school year. The group performs a wide arrange of contemporary music which is voted on and selected by the members. To be granted membership in the group, students must demonstrate their musical ability in an audition process and call back.

International Championship of Collegiate A Cappella 
The Bottom Line was accepted into the International Championship of Collegiate A Cappella four times, competing in the Northeast Region Quarterfinals in 2017, 2018, 2019, and 2021. On February 24, 2018, the group finished in second place in their Northeast quarterfinal competition at Central Connecticut State University, with Maxwell Pudvar earning an award for Top Vocal Percussion. The group advanced to the Northeast Semifinal competition at Boston Symphony Hall on March 4, 2018 but did not advance to finals.

Returning to competition the next year, The Bottom Line was named Northeast Quarterfinal Champions on March 9, 2019, at the University of Hartford. Janna Blackstone and Nina Grogan won an award for Top Choreography for their visual work on the set and for the second year in a row, Maxwell Pudvar received the Top Vocal Percussion award. On March 31, 2019, The Bottom Line returned to Boston Symphony Hall for the Northeast semifinal competition where they received fourth place in the region, and choreographers Janna Blackstone and Nina Grogan once again earned the top award for their work.

When the COVID-19 pandemic hit, the 2020 ICCA's were put on hold; the event was revived in 2021 as a virtual music video competition. The Bottom Line recorded, mixed, mastered, and shot a music video to "She Ain't Me", originally performed by Sinead Harnett and arranged by Tyler Nordin. This marked the group's first-ever music video. The audio was recorded, mixed, and mastered by student and Music Director Tyler Hahn. The Bottom Line's video placed third at the Northeast Region Quarterfinals on March 13, 2021.

Recordings 
After earning notoriety for their set selection at the International Championship of Collegiate A Cappella, The Bottom Line recorded their single, "Comeback", originally performed by Ella Eyre and arranged by Elliott von Wendt. The single was produced by The Vocal Company, a New York-based company known as the leader in a cappella production, and released in the fall of 2019.

The Bottom Line also released "She Ain't Me" as a single on all streaming platforms on April 23, 2021.

References

Collegiate a cappella groups
American vocal groups
2006 establishments in Rhode Island